KFFR (88.3 FM) is a radio station licensed to serve the community of Winter Park, Colorado. The station is owned by Fraser Valley Community Media, Inc. It airs a community radio format.

The station was assigned the KFFR call letters by the Federal Communications Commission on February 5, 2013.

References

External links
 Official Website
 

FFR
Radio stations established in 2015
2015 establishments in Colorado
Community radio stations in the United States
Grand County, Colorado